Joseph Brodsky (June 9, 1934 – May 25, 2006) was an American football coach. He won three Super Bowls with the Dallas Cowboys of the National Football League (NFL) and two national championships at the University of Miami. He played college football at the University of Florida.

Early years
Brodsky attended Miami Jackson High School, where he practiced football, basketball and baseball. As a senior, he was a fullback in the first Miami Jackson team to defeat Miami High School in 27 years. 

He was a teammate of Lee Corso, who would become a college head coach and sportcaster. He graduated in 1965 and received All-state honors.

College career
Brodsky accepted a football scholarship from the University of Florida, where he was a two-way player at fullback and linebacker. As a sophomore, he was the team's leading rusher with 82 carries for 378 yards (4.6-yard avg.). He also had 2 receptions for 11 yards, one touchdown and one kickoff return for 13 yards. He was a defensive line backup.

As a junior, he was limited with injuries and only played in 7 games, registering 24 carries for 92 yards (3.6-yard avg.).

As a senior, he didn't register any rushing stat, but he had 5 interceptions and set 3 individual school records for interceptions. In the season opener against Mississippi State University, he intercepted 3 passes and returned them for an NCAA record 162 yards. He set a school record with most yards returned from pass interceptions in a single-season (244 yards). He also practiced track and lettered four years in both sports. 

In 2002, he was inducted into the University of Florida Athletic Hall of Fame.

Professional career
Brodsky was selected by the Washington Redskins in the 16th round (189th overall) of the 1957 NFL Draft. He instead opted to sign a contract with the Winnipeg Blue Bombers to play professional football in Canada. He was waived before the start of the season.

Coaching career
In 1965, he began his coaching career in Miami Jackson High School, helping turn around the team's record. In 1971, he helped to launch the football program in Hialeah-Miami Lakes High School, where he coached his 2 sons, became one of the most successful South Florida head coaches and won a State Championship in 1975. Future NFL assistant coaches Joe Avezzano and Jerry Sullivan were some of his players.

In 1978, he joined Lou Saban's coaching staff at the University of Miami as the running back coach. He was a part of the 1983 National Championship team under head coach Howard Schnellenberger. He was a part of the 1987 National Championship team under head coach Jimmy Johnson. He also helped to develop players like: Ottis Anderson, Albert Bentley, Keith Griffin, Alonzo Highsmith, Warren Williams, Cleveland Gary, Melvin Bratton and Leonard Conley.

In 1989, he followed head coach Jimmy Johnson and joined the Dallas Cowboys coaching staff as the running back coach. He helped to develop Pro Football Hall of Famer and the NFL's All-time leading rusher Emmitt Smith and Pro Bowl fullback Daryl Johnston. He also contributed to the team winning Super Bowl XXVII, XXVIII and XXX.

In 1998, he was named the running backs coach for the Chicago Bears, reuniting with former Cowboys defensive coordinator Dave Wannstedt. In 1999, he wasn't retained after Dick Jauron replaced Wannstedt as the new Bears head coach.

Personal life
His son Larry was fifth on the University of Miami All-time receiving list and also played in the United States Football League. Brodsky died after a long battle with prostate cancer on May 25, 2006.

References

1934 births
2006 deaths
American football fullbacks
Chicago Bears coaches
Dallas Cowboys coaches
Florida Gators football players
Florida Gators men's track and field athletes
Miami Hurricanes football coaches
High school football coaches in Florida
Coaches of American football from Florida
Players of American football from Miami
Deaths from prostate cancer
Deaths from cancer in Florida
Miami Jackson Senior High School alumni